Kõima may refer to several places in Estonia:

Kõima, Audru Parish, village in Audru Parish, Pärnu County
Kõima, Koonga Parish, village in Koonga Parish, Pärnu County